Group A of the EuroBasket 2011 took place between 31 August and 5 September 2011. The group played all of its games at Cido Arena in Panevėžys, Lithuania.

The group was composed of Poland, Great Britain, Turkey, host Lithuania, defending champions Spain and Portugal, who qualified from additional qualifying round. The three best ranked teams advanced to the second round.

Standings

All times are local (UTC+3)

31 August

Spain vs. Poland

Turkey vs. Portugal

Lithuania vs. Great Britain

1 September

Portugal vs. Spain

Great Britain vs. Turkey

Poland vs. Lithuania

2 September

Spain vs. Great Britain

Portugal vs. Poland

Turkey vs. Lithuania

4 September

Great Britain vs. Portugal

Poland vs. Turkey

Lithuania vs. Spain

5 September

Great Britain vs. Poland

Spain vs. Turkey

Portugal vs. Lithuania

External links
Standings and fixtures

FIBA EuroBasket 2011
Sports competitions in Panevėžys
2011–12 in Spanish basketball
2011–12 in British basketball
2011–12 in Turkish basketball
2011–12 in Polish basketball
2011–12 in Portuguese basketball